Nathan Walker is an ice hockey player.

Nathan or Nate Walker may also refer to:

Musicians
Nathan Walker, musician in Elliot (band)
Nate Walka, Nathan Walker, American recording artist

Others
Nate Walker, Nathan Walker, American businessman and politician
Nate Walker, character in Revolution (TV series)
Nathan Walker, builder of Toaping Castle